The 2008 PGA Tour season ran from January 3 to November 9. The season consisted of 49 official money events. This included four major championships and three World Golf Championships, which are also sanctioned by the European Tour. There were also five unofficial events played in November and December.

Schedule
The following table lists official events during the 2008 season.

Unofficial events
The following events were sanctioned by the PGA Tour, but did not carry FedEx Cup points or official money, nor were wins official.

Location of tournaments

Money leaders
The money list was based on prize money won during the season, calculated in U.S. dollars.

Awards

Notes

References

External links
2008 PGA Tour at ESPN

PGA Tour seasons
PGA Tour